The men's compound recurve archery event at the 2010 Commonwealth Games was part of the archery programme and took place at the Yamuna Sports Complex.

Ranking Round

Finals

References 

Archery at the 2010 Commonwealth Games